Palermo is an unincorporated community in Upper Township, in Cape May County, New Jersey, United States.

The Palermo Air Force Station, closed in 1970, was located south of Palermo.

Demographics

History
An early settler, Henry Young, arrived in New Jersey aboard a whaling vessel prior to 1700, and established a plantation extending west from Palermo.

The Friendship School in Palermo was built around 1830, and was restored in 1980.  It is one of the oldest schools in Upper Township.

A post office was established in 1872.

The Ocean City Railroad constructed a line through Palermo, and a station was erected there in 1897.  The line later became part of the Pennsylvania-Reading Seashore Lines.  The line is now abandoned.

In 1953, a proposed extension of the Garden State Parkway was to be constructed through Palermo.  Several Upper Township farmers complained about the route, including one from Palermo who claimed "the parkway went through the center of his piggery".  A commission was established to settle disputes between farmers and the Parkway Authority.

Education
As with other parts of Upper Township, the area is zoned to Upper Township School District (for grades K-8) and Ocean City School District (for high school). The latter operates Ocean City High School.

Countywide schools include Cape May County Technical High School and Cape May County Special Services School District.

References

Upper Township, New Jersey
Unincorporated communities in Cape May County, New Jersey
Unincorporated communities in New Jersey